Daniel Mark "Danny" Southern (born 1 January 1975) is a former Australian rules footballer who played with the Western Bulldogs in the Australian Football League (AFL).

Southern was a defender and was recruited to the Bulldogs from Claremont in Western Australia.

He played 24 games in his debut season in 1994 and polled 12 Brownlow Medal votes in six of those games. Southern brought up his 100th game for the club in 2000 before yet another knee injury forced him to retire.

Southern moved to Egypt in 2004 to work as a tour leader and then ground manager for Intrepid Travel. He converted to Islam in 2005 and married an Egyptian Muslim in 2009. Amidst the chaos of the Egyptian Revolution of 2011, Daniel's wife Reham gave birth to their son Zakaria Daniel Mark Southern.

References

External links

1975 births
Living people
Australian rules footballers from Western Australia
Claremont Football Club players
Western Bulldogs players
Converts to Islam